is a subway station on the Toei Mita Line in Itabashi, Tokyo, Japan, operated by Toei Subway.

Lines

Toei Mita Line (I-24)

Platforms
The station consists of two elevated side platforms.

History
The station opened on 27 December 1968. In 2004, the original exit was renamed the East Exit and a new West Exit was completed in 2005.

References
This article incorporates information from the corresponding article on the Japanese Wikipedia.

Railway stations in Japan opened in 1968
Railway stations in Tokyo
Toei Mita Line